Garry Kitchen's Battletank is an action video game released by Absolute Entertainment in September 1990 for the Nintendo Entertainment System. The game is similar to the Atari game Battlezone, and supports one player. It was considered to be a poorly designed game, as it was intended to become a space flight game for the Commodore 64 during its development.

Gameplay

The player is placed inside a tank, hence the game has a first person view. The tank is equipped with a smokescreen, a missile launcher, a 150mm cannon, and a .50 caliber machine gun. The object of the game is to destroy enemy tanks and helicopters in the area. If the player fires the tank's guns for too long, they will overheat and will take time to cool down.

Reception
VideoGames & Computer Entertainments David Plotkin gave Battletank an overall score of 8 out of 10 and said "Battletank is a well-done, first-person tank simulator. It's easy to control, sports good graphics and is a lot of fun to play."

See also
Super Battletank
Super Battletank 2

References

1990 video games
Absolute Entertainment games
Imagineering (company) games
Nintendo Entertainment System games
Nintendo Entertainment System-only games
North America-exclusive video games
Tank simulation video games
Video games developed in the United States
Single-player video games